Princess Klementine Maria Octavia von Metternich (30 August 1804 – 6 May 1820) was an Austrian princess.

Biography 
Princess Klementine von Metternich was born on 30 August 1804 into the House of Metternich. Her father was the Austrian diplomat Klemens, Prince of Metternich-Winneburg zu Beilstein. Her mother was Countess Eleonore von Kaunitz, a granddaughter of Wenzel Anton, Prince of Kaunitz-Rietberg. She was their fifth child and second daughter.

Klementine was painted by Moritz Michael Daffinger in 1819, posed as the goddess Hebe. The painting Portrait of a Lady attributed to Sir Thomas Lawrence is allegedly a portrait of Klementine.

She died from tuberculosis on 6 May 1820.

References 

1804 births
1820 deaths
19th-century deaths from tuberculosis
Tuberculosis deaths in Austria
Klementine
House of Metternich
Royalty and nobility who died as children